Edgemont Historic District is a national historic district located at Rocky Mount, Edgecombe County, North Carolina. The district encompasses 293 contributing buildings in a predominantly residential section of Rocky Mount.  They were mostly built between about 1915 and 1950, and include notable examples of Classical Revival, Colonial Revival, and Bungalow / American Craftsman architecture. Notable buildings include the Trinity Lutheran Church (1937) and the former Edgemont School (1914).

It was listed on the National Register of Historic Places in 1999, with a boundary increase in 2002.

References

Historic districts on the National Register of Historic Places in North Carolina
Neoclassical architecture in North Carolina
Colonial Revival architecture in North Carolina
Buildings and structures in Edgecombe County, North Carolina
National Register of Historic Places in Edgecombe County, North Carolina